The 1925 Drake Bulldogs football team was an American football team that represented Drake University as a member of the Missouri Valley Conference (MVC) during the 1925 college football season. In its fifth season under head coach Ossie Solem, the team compiled a 5–3 record, placed second in the MVC, shut out four of eight opponents, and outscored its opponents by a total of 64 to 41.

On October 10, 1925, the team played its home opener at the newly-constructed Drake Stadium in Des Moines, Iowa. The stadium opened with seating for 18,000 spectators and was built at a cost of approximately $230,000. Drake shut out Kansas State (19–0) and Nebraska (14–0) in the first two games played at the new stadium.

Schedule

References

Drake
Drake Bulldogs football seasons
Drake Bulldogs football